Homaloxestis ceroxesta is a moth in the family Lecithoceridae. It was described by Edward Meyrick in 1918. It is found on Java and in southern India.

The wingspan is about 15 mm. The forewings are pale ochreous fuscous, the costa suffused with pale yellow ochreous. The hindwings are grey.

References

Moths described in 1918
Homaloxestis